Byasa laos, the Lao windmill, is a species of butterfly from the family Papilionidae. The species was first described by Norman Denbigh Riley and Edward John Godfrey in 1921.

The species is found in Laos and northern Thailand, of Southeast Asia region.

Status

Said to be very rare, but status not
known with any certainty. More data required for conservation assessment.

See also
List of butterflies of South Asia
List of butterflies of Taiwan

References

External links
 External images of holotype Global Butterfly Information System

Byasa
Butterflies of Indochina
Insects of Thailand
Butterflies described in 1921
Taxa named by Norman Denbigh Riley